Hal Merrill (born July 2, 1964, in Fredericton, New Brunswick) is a paralympic track and field athlete from Fredericton, New Brunswick, Canada competing mainly in category F52 throwing events.

Career
Merrill has competed in three Paralympics and has won three bronze medals over the course of his career. At the 1992 Summer Paralympics in Barcelona, Spain, Merrill won two bronze medals in the F52 shot put and discus throws, and placed 10th in the discus. At the 1996 Summer Paralympics in Atlanta, United States, Merrill won a bronze medal in the F51 shot put and placed 4th in the javelin. Merrill also competed in the 2000 Summer Paralympics in Sydney, Australia but was unable to place on the podium, finishing 8th in the shot put, 5th in the javelin, and 5th in the discus.

See also
 Athletics New Brunswick

References

1964 births
Paralympic track and field athletes of Canada
Athletes (track and field) at the 1992 Summer Paralympics
Athletes (track and field) at the 1996 Summer Paralympics
Athletes (track and field) at the 2000 Summer Paralympics
Paralympic bronze medalists for Canada
Living people
Sportspeople from Fredericton
Medalists at the 1992 Summer Paralympics
Medalists at the 1996 Summer Paralympics
Paralympic medalists in athletics (track and field)
Canadian male javelin throwers
Canadian male shot putters
Wheelchair javelin throwers
Wheelchair shot putters
Paralympic javelin throwers
Paralympic shot putters